Otto Karl Weinreich (1886–1972) was a German classical philologist. He is noted for his study of the Lukan Befreiungswunder through his work Gebet und Wunder.

Weinrich's works were focused on the so-called liberation miracles such as the miracles of the Dionysian "circles" (e.g. Dionysos' prison escape in the Euripides' play Bacchae). The miracles also included the miraculous escape of Moses; two liberations in the text Life of Apollonius of Tyana; and, the divine deliverances in the New Testament's Acts. He was also one of the editors of the Archiv für Religionswissenschaft (ARW).

References

German philologists
1886 births
1972 deaths
Commanders Crosses of the Order of Merit of the Federal Republic of Germany
20th-century philologists